American singer-songwriter Bridgit Mendler has recorded songs for two studio albums, one soundtrack and some of which were collaborations with others. A. Her first soundtrack, Lemonade Mouth, has peaked at number 4 on the Billboard 200. Her first single, "Somebody" debuted and peaked at number 89 in the US Billboard Hot 100 and sold 6,000 copies in the first week in the United States according to Nielsen SoundScan. Her second single, "Determinate" peaked at number 51 in the US Billboard Hot 100 and charting in two more countries. She was featured in the song, "Breakthrough" and debuted and peaked at number 88 in the US Billboard Hot 100.

On March 31, 2011, it was confirmed that Mendler had signed with Hollywood Records and had begun working on her debut album. In 2012, Mendler released her debut album Hello My Name Is..., which featured a pop sound. It debuted at number 30 on the US Billboard 200, and has sold over 200,000 copies. Her debut single off the album "Ready or Not", became an international Top 40 hit, the song was certified gold in Norway, and platinum in New Zealand, United States and Canada and peaked at number 49 on the Billboard Hot 100. It was announced that her second single would be "Hurricane". The video premiered on April 12, 2013 and was shot in London. "Hurricane" has been certified gold in the USA for selling 500,000 copies. As of July 2, 2015, Mendler has left Hollywood Records since she is no longer listed on their official website.

Songs

Unreleased songs

See also
Bridgit Mendler discography

References

 
Mendler, Bridgit